Lalmonirhat Sadar is an upazila of Lalmonirhat District in the Division of Rangpur, Bangladesh.

Geography
It has a total area of 259.54 km2. Teesta River flows inside this upazila.

Demographics

According to the 2011 Bangladesh census, Lalmonirhat Sadar Upazila had 79,147 households and a population of 333,166, 18.1% of whom lived in urban areas. 10.5% of the population was under the age of 5. The literacy rate (age 7 and over) was 47.5%, compared to the national average of 51.8%.

Administration
Lalmonirhat Sadar Upazila is divided into Lalmonirhat Municipality and nine union parishads: Barobari, Gokunda, Harati, Khuniagachh, Kulaghat, Mogolhat, Mohendranagar, Panchagram, and Rajpur. The union parishads are subdivided into 117 mauzas and 173 villages.

Lalmonirhat Municipality is subdivided into 9 wards and 64 mahallas.

Education

There are 19 colleges in the upazila. They include honors level Lalmonirhat Government College.

See also
Lalmonirhat Junction
Upazilas of Bangladesh
Districts of Bangladesh
Divisions of Bangladesh

References

Upazilas of Lalmonirhat District